Hyacinthe-Eugène Meunier (14 May 184122 April 1906), known as Eugène Murer, was a pastry chef, author, self-taught painter and collector of impressionist paintings.

He was born in Poitiers on 14 May 1846. He was a childhood friend of Armand Guillaumin, who introduced him to the impressionists. He was an apprentice pastry chef at Grû at 8 Rue du Faubourg-Montmartre and 125 Faubourg Poissonnière.

He ran a patisserie at 95 Boulevard Voltaire, where he invited, for "Tuesday-dinner", young artists, collectors, and established artists. Renoir, Sisley, Monet, Cézanne, Gachet, Vincent and Theo Van Gogh, Père Tanguy, art dealers Louis Legrand and Alphonse Portier, Goeneutte, Guillaumin, Vignon, Pierre Franc-Lamy, and Pissarro were among his guests.  British art historian Colin B. Bailey notes that Murer's diary from this time contains a sad entry about the suicide of Vincent van Gogh that demands further study.

He died in Auvers-sur-Oise, where he was a neighbour of Gachet, on 22 April 1906. He lived on 39 rue Victor Massé, Paris, above a carpenter and art supply dealer called Michel, where he bought his paints. The Musée d'Orsay owns one of his paintings, L'Oise at Isle-Adam, from 1903.

Bibliography 
He published under the pseudonym Gêne-Mûr.

 Comment Se Vengent Les Batards; 1865  
 Les Fils du siècle; 1877 
 Pauline Lavinia; 1887  
 La mère Nom de Dieu! 1888

A portrait by Camille Pissarro from 1878 is in the collection of the Museum of Fine Arts in Springfield, Massachusetts.

Gallery

References 

1841 births
1906 deaths
French art collectors
French chefs
Date of birth uncertain
19th-century French writers
19th-century French painters
Pastry chefs